This is a list of stations that have been closed since the building of railways in metropolitan Perth, Western Australia.

Mundaring Line
In some cases there are stations that were so effectively removed that there are no traces left, such as Bellevue. However, at Mundaring and Darlington, concrete platform edges remain.

Although Mundaring Branch Railway stations were closed in 1954, it was not until the 1960s that the line was formally closed, and the line and stations removed after that.

Metropolitan lines
The lines to Karragullen along the Upper Darling Range Railway, and to Chidlow (via Parkerville or Mundaring), were considered to be part of the metropolitan service by the Western Australian Government Railways administration at the time they were operating.

Section closures
In some cases single stations were closed for logistical reasons; generally it was a group of stations when a section of railway was closed.

1881–1930
Fremantle railway station at Cliff Street (1881–1907), demolished upon the construction of the new Fremantle railway station at Market St.
East Fremantle (1881–1907), rebuilt 1886, removed upon the construction of the new Fremantle railway station at Market St.

1930–1949

Upper Darling Range line 

Closed to traffic in July 1949, due to the 1949 Australian coal strike

Bushmead
Rifle Range
Ridge Hill (at or near )
Gooseberry Hill (at or near )
Kalamunda
South Kalamunda
Walliston
Bickley (at or near )
Carmel (at or near )
Turner's Siding
Pickering Brook
Canning Mills (at or near )
Karragullen (at or near )

1950–1966

Mundaring Weir line
Wonyil, closed 14 November 1952 
O'Connor (originally No 2 Pumping Station), opened 1922, closed 14 November 1952 
Portagabra, opened 1936, closed 14 November 1952 
Karda Mordo, opened 1919, closed 14 November 1952 
Mundaring Weir, opened 1910, closed 14 November 1952

Bayswater–Belmont Spur of the Midland Line

Closed in January 1957 after fire damaged the rail bridge over the Swan River

Whatley, Bayswater, terminus of the Belmont spur from 1885 to 1897 until construction of the Belmont Bridge.
Belmont, terminus of the Belmont spur line from 1897

Eastern Railway First Route (Mundaring Loop)
Traffic ceased on the Mundaring Loop between Bellevue and Mount Helena in 1954 before it was officially closed by parliament in 1966.

Koongamia  1962 - 1966
Greenmount, stayed open for Mountain Quarry, Boya until 1 January 1966
Boya
Darlington
Glen Forrest
Nyaania
Mahogany Creek
Zamia
Mundaring
Sawyers Valley
Mount Helena

South Western Railway
Canning Park Racecourse was closed in 1952; from then on, access was via a siding from Maddington. Later, it was truncated to a 100 m siding for the loading of blue metal from Swan Quarry, in Orange Grove. Closed and removed by 1975.

Eastern Railway Second Route
The Second Route closed on 13 February 1966.
Midland Junction
Bellevue
Helena Vale
Swan View
National Park
Hovea
Parkerville
Stoneville
Chidlow

1966–2000
During this period, a number of stations were closed on the 1906-era line to Robbs Jetty and Spearwood line.

The 1987 America's Cup defence had seen the construction of railway stations established to transport people during the event.

Esplanade, demolished in 2018.
Success Harbour, demolished in 2018.
South Beach

Spearwood
Leighton, opened November 1922, closed 28 July 1991. This station closed when the North Fremantle station was relocated further north of its original position. It was named after Leighton's Crossing, which was named for Mrs Ann Leighton, the crossing gatekeeper in the late 1880s.
Stokely was situated on the South Western Railway between Maddington and Gosnells at the Albany Highway crossing. Opened 1954, closed 15 April 1989.
Tredale was situated on the South Western Railway 800 metres south of Armadale railway station, opened in 1956 as Armadale School siding, renamed Tredale in 1959, closed in 1989.
West Perth on the east side of the West Perth Subway, which served the Perth Metropolitan Markets, was closed. A new station, on the west side of the subway, was opened on 18 June 1986 as West Perth. Its name was changed to City West on 19 November 1987.

2000–present
Lathlain (ALN) South Western Railway, closed 3 February 2003
Belmont Park (ABP) South Western Railway, closed 13 October 2013

Stations to cease operation
Welshpool (AWL) South Western Railway, to close late 2023.

Unknown date
Naval Base once had a train station to serve the factory workers for the Alcoa Alumina refinery, though it appeared In the 2005 UBD street map.

See also
Closed railway stations in Western Australia, for non-Perth closures

References

Resources
A useful map drawn by J. Austin showing all rail services intact as of 1949 is found in Finlayson, Don (1986) Steam around PerthARHS WA page 48.  The list of closures is in table form on pages 49 and 50.
Higham, G.J.	'Where WAS that? : an historical gazetteer of Western Australia'  Winthrop, W.A. : Geoproject Solutions Pty Ltd, 2006. 2nd ed. 
Watson, Lindsay The Railway History Of Midland Junction : Commemorating The Centenary Of Midland Junction, 1895–1995 Swan View, W.A : L & S Drafting in association with the Shire of Swan and the Western Australian Light Railway Preservation Association, [1995]
Watson, Lindsay.Midland Junction Railway Station  Western rails, Vol 9, no.4(July 1987), p. 10–12
Verney, Terry 'Thru Midland' The WESTLAND  issue 218, March 2003 p. 4

Lists of railway stations in Australia
Railway stations, closed